Ernophthora denticornis is a species of snout moth in the genus Ernophthora. It was described by Edward Meyrick in 1929. It is found on the Marquesas Archipelago in French Polynesia.

References

Moths described in 1929
Cabniini